Strathfieldsaye can mean:
 Strathfieldsaye, Victoria, Australia
 an alternative spelling for the name of the Stratfield Saye estate, Hampshire, England